The 2010 Union budget of India was presented by Finance minister Pranab Mukherjee in the Lok Sabha on Friday, February 26, 2010.

Highlights 
 The Indian economy was facing grave uncertainty. Growth had started decelerating when the interim and full budget for 2009-10 were presented.
 At home there was added uncertainty because of subnormal southwest monsoon.
 Yet, the economy now in a far better position than it was eight years ago.
 India weathered the economic crisis well and emerged from the global slowdown faster than any other country.
 First challenge before the government is to quickly revert to high GDP growth path of 9%.
 Expects 10% economic growth in the near future.
 Second challenge is to harness economic growth to make it more inclusive and consolidate gains.
 Third challenge is to overcome weakness in government's public delivery mechanism; a long way to go in this.
 Impressive recovery in the past few months. Can witness faster recovery in the coming months.
 Food security has been strengthened. But bottleneck of the public delivery mechanism can hold us back.
 Fiscal year 2009-10 was challenging for the economy.
 Focus shifted to non-governmental actors and an enabling government. Government now concentrates on supporting and delivering services to the poorer sections.
 Economy stabilised in the first quarter of 2009 itself.
 18.5% manufacturing growth in December was the highest in two decades.
 Figures for merchandise exports for January encouraging after turnaround in November and December last year.
 Double digit food inflation last year due to bad monsoon and drought-like conditions.
 Government conscious of the price rise and taking steps to tackle it.
 Erratic monsoon and drought-like conditions forced supply-side bottleneck that fuelled inflation.
 Need to review stimulus imparted to economy last year to overcome the recession.
 Need to ensure that the demand-supply imbalance is managed.
 Need to make growth more broad-based.
 Need to review public spending and mobilise resources.
 Status paper on public debt within six months.
 Government hopes to implement direct tax code from April 2011.
 Earnest endeavour to implement general sales tax in April 2011.
 Government will raise 25,000 crore from divestment of its stake in state-owned firms.
 Kirit Parekh report on fuel price deregulation will be taken up by petroleum minister Murli Deora in due course.
 Nutrient-based fertiliser subsidy scheme to come into force from April 1 this year.
 Nutrient-based fertiliser subsidy will reduce volatility of subsidy and also reduce it.
 Market capitalisation of five public-sector undertakings listed since October increased by 3.5 times.
 FDI inflows steady during the year. Government has taken series of steps to simplify FDI regime. Intends to make FDI policy user friendly by compiling all guidelines into one document.
 Government has decided to set up apex-level Financial
 Stability and Development Council.
 RBI considering issuing banking licences to private companies. Non-banking finance companies will also be considered if they meet the criteria.
 Government to provide 16,500 crore to public-sector banks to maintain tier-I capital.
 Government to continue interest subvention of 2% for one more year for exports covering handicrafts, carpets, handlooms and small and medium enterprises.
 Government to provide 300 crore to organise 60,000 pulse and oilseed villages and provide integrated intervention of watershed and related programmes.
 200 crore provided for climate-resilient agriculture initiative.
 Government committed to ensuring continued growth of special economic zones
 Need to take firm view on opening up of the retail sector.
 Deficit in foodgrains storage capacity to be met with private-sector participation.
 Period for repayment of loans by farmers extended by six months to June 30, 2010, in view of the drought and floods in some parts of the country.
 Interest subvention for timely repayment of crop loans raised from 1% to 2%, bringing the effective rate of interest to 5%.
 Road transport allocation raised by 13% to 19,894 crore.
 Proposal to maintain thrust of upgrading infrastructure in rural and urban areas. IIFCL authorised to refinance infrastructure projects.
 1,73,552 crore provided for infrastructure development.
 Allocation for railways fixed at 16,752 crore, an increase of 950 crore over the last financial year.
 Government proposes to set up Coal Development Regulatory Authority.
 Mega power plant policy modified to lower cost of generation; allocation to power sector more than doubled to 5,130 crore in 2010-11.
 Government favours competitive bidding for coal blocks for captive power plants.
 500 crore allocated for solar and hydro projects for the Ladakh region in Jammu & Kashmir.
 Clean Energy Fund to be created for research in new energy sources.
 Allocation for new and renewable energy ministry increased by 61% to 1,000 crore.
 One-time grant of 200 crore provided to Tirupur textile cluster in Tamil Nadu.
 Allocation for National Ganga River Basin Authority doubled to 500 crore.
 Alternative port to be developed at Sagar Island in West Bengal.
 Draft of Food Security Bill ready, to be placed in the public domain soon.
 Outlay for social sectors pegged at 1,37,674 crore, accounting for 37% of the total plan allocation.
 Plan allocation for school education raised from 26,800 crore to 31,036 crore in 2010-11.
 25% of plan outlay earmarked for rural infrastructure development.
 Plan allocation for health and family welfare increased to 22,300 crore from 19,534 crore.
 For rural development, 66,100 crore have been allocated.
 Allocation for National Rural Employment Guarantee Authority stepped up to 40,100 crore in 2010-11.
 Indira Awas Yojana's unit cost raised to 45,000 in the plains and 48,500 in hilly areas.
 Allocation for urban development increased by 75% to 5,400 crore in 2010-11.
 1% interest subvention loan for houses costing up to 20 lakh extended to March 31, 2011; 700 crore provided.
 Allocation for development of micro and small-scale sector raised from 1,794 crore to 2,400 crore.
 1,270 crore provided for slum development programme, marking an increase of 700%.
 Government to set up National Social Security Fund with initial allocation of 1,000 crore to provide social security to workers in the unorganised sector.
 Government to contribute 1,000 per annum to each account holder under the new pension scheme.
 Exclusive skill development programme to be launched for textile and garment-sector employees.
 Allocation for woman and child development increased by 80%
 Plan outlay for the social justice ministry raised by 80% to 4,500 crore.
 Plan allocation for minority affairs ministry raised from 1,740 crore to 2,600 crore.
 Financial-Sector Legislative Reforms Committee to be set up.
 1,900 crore allocated for Unique Identification Authority of India.
 A unique identity symbol will be provided to the rupee in line with the US dollar, British pound sterling, euro and Japanese yen.
 Defence allocation pegged at 1,47,344 crore in 2010-11 against 1,41,703 crore in the previous year. Of this, capital expenditure would account for 60,000 crore.
 Planning Commission to prepare integrated action plan for
 Naxal-affected areas to encourage "misguided elements" to eschew violence and join the mainstream.
 Gross tax receipts pegged at 7,46,656 crore for 2010-11, non-tax revenues at 1,48,118 crore.
 Total expenditure pegged at 11.8 lakh crore, an increase of 8.6%.
 Fiscal deficit at 5.5%.
 Fiscal deficit seen at 4.8% and 4.1% in 2011-12 and 2012–13, respectively.
 Non-plan expenditure pegged at 37,392 crore and plan expenditure at 7,35,657 crore in budget estimates. Proposed increase of 15% in plan expenditure and 6% in non-plan expenditure.
 Cash subsidy for fuel and fertiliser instead of previous practice of bonds to continue.
 Fiscal deficit pegged at 6.9% in 2009-10 as against 7.8% in the previous fiscal.
 Government's net borrowing to be 3,45,010 crore for 2010-11.
 Income-tax department ready with two-page Saral-2 returns form for individual salaried assesses.
 Personal income-ax rates pruned:
 Income up to 1.6 lakh — nil
 Income above 1.6 lakh and up to 5 lakh — 10%
 Income above 5 lakh and up to 8 lakh — 20%
 Income above 8 lakh — 30%
 Additional deduction of 20,000 allowed on long-term infrastructure bonds for income-tax payers; this is above 1 lakh on savings instruments allowed already.
 Investment-linked tax deductions to be allowed to two-star hotels anywhere in the country.
 Weighted deduction of 125% for payments to approved associations doing social and statistical research.
 One-time interim relief to housing and real-estate sector.
 Businesses with a turnover of up to 60 lakh and professionals earning up to 15 lakh to be exempted from the obligation to audit their accounts.
 Housing projects allowed to be completed in five years instead of four to avail of tax breaks.
 Revenue loss of 26,000 crore on direct tax proposals.
 Central excise duty on all non-petroleum products raised to 10% from 8%.
 FM increases customs duty on crude oil to 5%, on diesel and petrol to 7.5%, and on other petroleum products to 10%.
 Structural changes in excise duties on cigarettes, cigars, and cigarillos.
 Clean energy cess of 50 per ton to be levied on coal produced in India.
 Concessional excise duty of 4% on solar cycle rickshaws.
 Balloons exempted from central excise duty.
 Customs and central excise proposals to result in a net revenue gain of 43,500 crore.
 More services to be brought under the service tax net.
 Certain accredited news agencies exempted from payment of service tax.
 Net revenue gain from tax proposals pegged at 20,500 crore.

See also
Dream Budget

References

External links
 Government of India: Union Budget and Economic Survey, Official website
 Union Budget of India 2010 : Budget Speech of Hon'ble Finance Minister, Official website
 Video: Panel discuss the 2010 Indian Union Budget, Asia Society, New York, March 2, 2010

Union budgets of India
Union Budget Of India, 2010
Manmohan Singh administration
Union budget of India